Maenola is a spider genus of the jumping spider family, Salticidae from South America.

Species
 Maenola braziliana Soares & Camargo, 1948 (Brazil)
 Maenola lunata Mello-Leitão, 1940 (Guyana)
 Maenola starkei Simon, 1900 (Venezuela)

References 

Salticidae
Spiders of South America
Salticidae genera